Pablo Nicolas Heredia (born 11 June 1990) is an Argentine-born Chilean professional footballer who plays as a goalkeeper for San Luis.

Career

Club
Heredia began with San Martin de Río Grande, prior to joining Belgrano in 2005. Six years later, he was an unused substitute for games against Ferro Carril Oeste and San Martín (SJ) in the 2010–11 Primera B Nacional season which ended with the club being promoted to the Argentine Primera División. Five further unused sub appearances followed in 2012–13 in all competitions, prior to him making his professional debut on 16 February 2014 in an away league win over Boca Juniors at La Bombonera. Heredia went onto make ten appearances, including two in the 2015 Copa Sudamericana, in the next three seasons.

In July 2016, Heredia joined Central Córdoba of Primera B Nacional on loan. He played twelve times throughout 2016–17, as Central Córdoba were relegated, before returning to Belgrano. He terminated his contract with Belgrano at the end of 2018. On 17 January 2019, Heredia completed a move to Chile's Unión La Calera.

International
Heredia played for the Argentina U20s.

Career statistics
.

References

External links

1990 births
Living people
Sportspeople from Mendoza Province
Argentine sportspeople of Chilean descent
Argentine footballers
Argentina youth international footballers
Argentina under-20 international footballers
Association football goalkeepers
Argentine expatriate footballers
Expatriate footballers in Chile
Argentine expatriate sportspeople in Chile
Primera Nacional players
Argentine Primera División players
Club Atlético Belgrano footballers
Central Córdoba de Santiago del Estero footballers
Unión La Calera footballers
Citizens of Chile through descent
Naturalized citizens of Chile